"The White EP" is a Record Store Day 7" single on white vinyl by British synthpop band Mirrors. The single was released in the UK on 16 April 2011.

The single includes two songs which were released on Mirrors' first EP Broken by Silence in November 2010.

The A-side features a cover version by Laura Cantrell, whereas the B-side is a remix of their non-album track "Lights and Offerings".

Track listing

Personnel
A-side:
 Laura Cantrell (vocals)
 William Tyler (acoustic guitar)
 Chris Scruggs (upright bass)
 Paul Niehaus (pedal steel guitar)
 Fats Kaplin (fiddle)
 Paul Burch (fender rhodes)
 Ben Martin (percussion)
B-side:
 James New
 Ally Young
 James Arguile
 Josef Page

References

External links
 Official Website
 Skint Records
 Official German Portal

2011 EPs
Record Store Day releases